Perri Luc Kiely (born 15 December 1995) is a British street dancer, TV and radio presenter. He is a member of the dance troupe Diversity, which won the third series of Britain's Got Talent in 2009. He finished as runner-up in the 12th series of Dancing on Ice in 2020. He and fellow Diversity star Jordan Banjo co-present the radio show 'KISS Breakfast'.

Career

2007–present: Diversity

Kiely is a member of the dance troupe Diversity, which was formed in 2007 and won the third series of Britain's Got Talent in 2009.

In July and August 2011, Kiely and fellow Diversity members Mitchell Craske and Ashton Russell, along with fellow Dancework studio dancer Nathan Ramsey, took part in the Born to Shine roadshow. At each show, two of the four would perform and take part in a dance masterclass for children.

Kiely and fellow Diversity member Jordan Banjo took on the role of the backstage presenters for the fourth series of Got to Dance in the spring of 2013.

In summer 2013, Kiely and Banjo hosted their own television show called Jordan and Perri's Ultimate Block Party, which saw them transform a club (swim team, youth club etc.) into a dance troupe.

It was announced on 17 February 2014 that Banjo and Kiely would be the UK hosts for the 2014 Nickelodeon Kids' Choice Awards

In March 2014, Kiely and Craske took part in the ITV - Where The Entertainers Live advert campaign.

Banjo and Kiely were again announced as the UK hosts for the Nickelodeon Kids’ Choice Awards for 2015 and 2016. Kiely took part in the second series of E4 dating show Celebs Go Dating.

2014: Splash!

Kiely participated in the second series of Splash!, which began airing on 4 January 2014. He won the show, beating Richard Whitehead in the final.

Note* Each judge's scores are out of a possible 10 points (30 in total)

2020–present: KISS Breakfast

On 3 August, Kiely and Jordan Banjo began presenting the radio show 'Kiss Breakfast' every weekday from 6am.

Filmography

References

External links

Official Diversity website
Perri Kiely website

British hip hop dancers
English male dancers
British children's television presenters
Britain's Got Talent contestants
Living people
1995 births
21st-century British dancers